CreaTV San Jose (abbreviated CRTV) is a nonprofit organization based in San Jose, California, United States, that broadcasts several public-access television channels in San Jose and the surrounding Silicon Valley area. Under federal law, CreaTV receives a share of the gross revenue of local cable franchisees Comcast and AT&T, which amounted to $ in 2009.

History
CreaTV was founded on June 22, 2008, to take over San Jose community television from Comcast Cable, which for at least 15 years had made their 10th Street studio available for public access. CreaTV went on the air on July 1, 2008, nine days after its founding.

Programming
CreaTV operates four public-access and educational television channels for the City of San Jose. Three of the channels are available on Xfinity systems in San Jose and Campbell:

 CRTV 15 The Outlet (formerly the Community Channel)
 CRTV 28 Classrooms Channel
 CRTV 30 Silicon Valley Channel

CRTV 27 Bay Voice Channel is available in 15 cities in Santa Clara and San Mateo counties. It is coproduced with KMVT 15 in Mountain View and the Midpeninsula Community Media Center in Palo Alto.

References

External links
 

American public access television
Culture of San Jose, California
Companies based in San Jose, California
Television channels and stations established in 2008
2008 establishments in California
Television in San Jose, California
Campbell, California